Nasrul Hamid (born 13 November 1964) is an Awami League politician and the State Minister for the Ministry of Power, Energy, and Mineral Resources of Bangladesh.

Early life and education
Hamid was born on 13 November 1964. He completed his S.S.C. in 1980, and his H.S.C. in 1982 from the Dhaka Residential Model College. He completed his bachelor's degree from University of Dhaka.

Career 
Hamid took primary membership of the Awami League in 1995, being appointed as the General Secretary of the Keraniganj Upazila Awami League. He competed in the General Election of 2001. Hamid was elected to Parliament from Dhaka-3 (Keraniganj) in 2008. He received 112,623 votes while his nearest rival, Gayeshwar Chandra Roy of Bangladesh Nationalist Party, received 70,680 votes.

Hamid was re-elected in 2014 from Dhaka-3 unopposed after the election was boycotted by all major parties including the Bangladesh Nationalist Party.

Hamid was elected to Parliament from Dhaka-3 as a candidate of Awami League in 2018. During the election his rival Gayeshwar Chandra Roy of Bangladesh Nationalist Party was assaulted by Awami League activists and police officers from Detective Branch. He visited Roy after the incident and expressed regreats.

Hamid has been serving as State Minister for the Ministry of Power, Energy and Mineral Resources from 2014. He has been appointed again to the same position for second time in the year of 2019 and he has joined on January 7, 2019.

Hamid is also a patron of CRI (Center for Research and Information), which is the Research Wing of Awami League. Hamid intervened personally to ensure a 305 million USD contract for Matarbari Port went to a consortium composed of Marubeni Corporation, Vitol, and PowerCo International, a little known company with a 100 dollar paid up capital based in Singapore. PowerCo International is owned by Hamid's uncle and linked to his family owned Hamid Group.

Awards
Hamid was awarded the Order of Civil Merit (Orden del Civil Mérito) of Spain from Spanish Ambassador Álvaro de Salas Giménez de Azcárate on behalf of King Felipe VI of Spain at a programme in Dhaka.

References

External links
 

1964 births
Living people
People from Dhaka District
University of Dhaka alumni
Awami League politicians
Ministry of Power, Energy and Mineral Resources
9th Jatiya Sangsad members
10th Jatiya Sangsad members
11th Jatiya Sangsad members
Dhaka Residential Model College alumni